Sonia López (January 11, 1946—) is a Mexican singer and actress, popular in the 1960s for her tropical hits. Known as "La Chamaca de Oro", she is best known for hits such as Corazón de Acero, El Ladrón, El Nido, Canela Pura, De México a La Habana, Mi caprichito, and her work with Sonora Santanera. She is part of the last stage of the Golden Age of Mexican cinema.

Sources
 Soy Una Cantante Totalmente del Pueblo - Interview with Sonia López at americasalsa.com, Sep. 2001
 Sonia López at Amazon.com
 

1946 births
Living people
Mexican women singers
Women in Latin music